Friederich Pius Philipp Furtwängler (April 21, 1869 – May 19, 1940) was a German number theorist.

Biography
Furtwängler wrote an 1896 doctoral dissertation at the University of Göttingen on cubic forms (Zur Theorie der in Linearfaktoren zerlegbaren ganzzahligen ternären kubischen Formen), under Felix Klein. Most of his academic life, from 1912 to 1938, was spent at the University of Vienna, where he taught for example Kurt Gödel, who later said that Furtwängler's lectures on number theory were the best mathematical lectures that he ever heard; Gödel had originally intended to become a physicist but turned to mathematics partly as a result of Furtwängler's lectures. Furtwängler was paralysed and, without notes, lectured from a wheelchair while his assistant wrote equations on the blackboard.

Some of Furtwängler's doctoral students were Wolfgang Gröbner, Nikolaus Hofreiter, Henry Mann, Otto Schreier, and Olga Taussky-Todd. Through these and others, he has over 3000 academic descendants.

He is now best known for his contribution to the principal ideal theorem in the form of his Beweis des Hauptidealsatzes für Klassenkörper algebraischer Zahlkörper (1929).

Philipp Furtwängler was a grandson of the organ builder Philipp Furtwängler (1800-1867) and a second cousin of the conductor Wilhelm Furtwängler.

Selected publications
with Helmut Hasse and W. Jehne: Allgemeine Theorie der algebraischen Zahlen. Vol. 8. Teubner, 1953.

See also
Eisenstein reciprocity
Hilbert class field
Keller's conjecture
Kummer–Vandiver conjecture
Principalization (algebra)

References

Sources

External links
 
 http://bibliothek.bbaw.de/kataloge/literaturnachweise/furtwaen/literatur.pdf (PDF-Datei; 35 kB)
 Friederich Pius Philipp Furtwängler at the MacTutor History of Mathematics archive

20th-century German mathematicians
Austrian mathematicians
1869 births
1940 deaths
19th-century German mathematicians
Number theorists
Austro-Hungarian mathematicians
Academic staff of the University of Vienna
University of Göttingen alumni
Scientists from Lower Saxony